Gobiobotia kolleri is a species of small freshwater fish in the family Cyprinidae. It is endemic to Hainan and Vietnam.

Named in honor of the late Otto Koller, Naturhistorisches Museum Wien, the first ichthyologist to examine specimens in 1927 on which species is based.

References

 

Gobiobotia
Taxa named by Petre Mihai Bănărescu
Taxa named by Teodor T. Nalbant
Fish described in 1966